Navadurga, also spelled Navdurga and Navadurgas, are nine manifestations and forms of Durga in Hinduism, especially worshipped during Navaratri and Durga Puja. They are often considered collectively as a single deity, mainly among the followers of Shaktism and Shaivism sect of Hinduism. 

According to Hindu mythology, the nine forms are considered the nine stages of Durga during the nine-day long duration of the war with demon-king Mahishasura, where the tenth day is celebrated as the Vijayadashami among the Hindus and is considered as one of the most important festivals.

Background 

During the festival of Navaratri, nine unmarried virgin girls up to the age of nine years are worshiped and fed as they are considered to be the incarnations of these nine goddesses. Then, the Nabapatrika ritual during Durga Puja involves tying the branches of eight plants with their leaves with a banana plant (naba meaning 'nine', and patrika meaning 'leaves').

The nine forms

Main forms

Other forms 
According to traditions and Hindu scriptures Navadurga has different forms. The Agni Purana lists them as:

 Rudrachanda
 Prachanda
 Chandogra
 Chandanayika
 Chanda
 Chandavati
 Chandarupa
 Atichandika
 Ugrachanda
Nine forms of Rajarajeshwari are worshiped as Navadurga forms on the nine days of Navaratri at the famous Kanaka Durga Temple in Vijayawada, Andhra Pradesh.

 Swarna Kavachalankrita Durga 
 Bala Tripurasundari 
 Annapurna 
 Gayatri
 Lalitha Tripura sundari
 Saraswati 
 Mahalakshmi 
 Durga
 Mahishasuramardhini

See also 
 Mahavidya
 Navaratri

References

Notes

Citations

Sources

 
 
 
 
  
  
 </ref> 
 

 
Hindu goddesses
Forms of Parvati
9 (number)